The 2008 Thailand League Division 2 Group A had 11 teams.

The league winners and runners up were promoted to Thailand Division 1 League. No teams would be relegated due to restructuring at the end of the season.

Member clubs 
Cha Choeng Sao FC (Relegation from Thailand Division 1 League 2007 11th Group B)
Chiang Mai FC
Nakhon Ratchasima FC  (Relegation from Thailand Division 1 League 2007 9th Group B)
Narathiwat FC (Relegation from Thailand Division 1 League 2007 8th Group A)
Prachinburi FC 
Raj Pracha FC (Promoted 2007-08 Khǒr Royal Cup (ถ้วย ข.) Winner)
Ratchaburi FC  (Relegation from Thailand Division 1 League 2007 12th Group A)
Sakon Nakhon FC (Relegation from 2007 Thailand Division 1 League 10th Group A)
Samut Prakan FC
Satun FC
Songkhla FC  (promoted from Provincial League 2007 Runner Up)

Stadium and locations

Final league table

Results

See also 
 2008 Thailand Premier League
 2008 Thailand League Division 1
 2008 Thailand League Division 2
 2008 Thailand League Division 2 (Group B)
Thailand 2008 RSSSF

References

External links
 Official website
 Football Association of Thailand

3
Thai League T4 seasons